An ice show is an entertainment production which is primarily performed by ice skaters. Such shows may primarily be skating exhibitions, or may be musical and/or dramatic in nature, using skating as a medium in order to accompany a musical work or to present a story.  The term generally excludes skating competitions in (professional) sports.  Many companies produce fixed or touring ice shows, which are then performed for the general public in facilities such as multipurpose arenas or skating rinks which can accommodate spectators, or in theatres with a temporary ice surface installed on the stage.  Ice shows are also featured as entertainment in amusement parks and on some large cruise ships.

Notable ice shows
 Ice Capades and Ice Follies are historical ice shows that were held from the 1930s to 1980s.
 Broadway on Ice is an ice-based revue of Broadway show tunes.
 Disney on Ice produces ice shows, primarily geared towards children, based on Disney films and characters.
 Holiday on Ice is a musical ice show which primarily performs in Europe and South America.
 Champions on Ice, Stars on Ice, and Fantasy on Ice are touring ice shows which focus on skating exhibitions, featuring elite competitive skaters.
 With Prologue (2022) and Gift (2023), two-time Olympic champion Yuzuru Hanyu from Japan challenged the concept of a solo ice show format for the first time, with him as the only scheduled skater.

References

External links